In linguistics, a segment is "any discrete unit that can be identified, either physically or auditorily, in the stream of speech". The term is most used in phonetics and phonology to refer to the smallest elements in a language, and this usage can be synonymous with the term phone.

In spoken languages, segments will typically be grouped into consonants and vowels, but the term can be applied to any minimal unit of a linear sequence meaningful to the given field of analysis, such as a mora or a syllable in prosodic phonology, a morpheme in morphology, or a chereme in sign language analysis.

Segments are called "discrete" because they are, at least at some analytical level, separate and individual, and temporally ordered.  Segments are generally not completely discrete in speech production or perception, however.  The articulatory, visual and acoustic cues that encode them often overlap. Examples of overlap for spoken languages can be found in discussions of phonological assimilation, coarticulation, and other areas in the study of phonetics and phonology, especially autosegmental phonology.

Other articulatory, visual or acoustic cues, such as prosody (tone, stress), and secondary articulations such as nasalization, may overlap multiple segments and cannot be discretely ordered with them. These elements are known as suprasegmentals.

Types 
In phonetics, the smallest perceptible segment is a phone. In phonology, there is a subfield of segmental phonology that deals with the analysis of speech into phonemes (or segmental phonemes), which correspond fairly well to phonetic segments of the analysed speech.

The segmental phonemes of sign language (formally called "cheremes") are visual movements of hands, face, and body.  They occur in a distinct spatial and temporal order.  The SignWriting script represents the spatial order of the segments with a spatial cluster of graphemes.  Other notations for sign language use a temporal order that implies a spatial order.

Marginal segments 
When analyzing the inventory of segmental units in any given language, some segments will be found to be marginal, in the sense that they are only found in onomatopoeic words, interjections, loan words, or a very limited number of ordinary words, but not throughout the language. Marginal segments, especially in loan words, are often the source of new segments in the general inventory of a language.

Suprasegmentals 
Some contrastive elements of speech cannot be easily analyzed as distinct segments but rather belong to a syllable or word. These elements are called suprasegmental, and include intonation and stress. In some languages nasality and vowel harmony are considered suprasegmental or prosodic by some phonologists.

See also
 Emic unit
 Speech segmentation

References

Citations

Sources 
 
 
 

Phonology
Phonetics
Linguistic units